Alloceratites is a genus of ammonoid cephalopods from the Middle Triassic of Germany included in the family Ceratitidae.

The mature shell of Alloceratites has strong, well spaced lateral tubercles and clavi (nodes) along either side of the venter. Ribbing between tubercles is indistinct. The suture is ceratitic.

References

 Arkell, et al. 1957. Mesozoic Ammonoidea; Treatise on Invertebrate Paleontology. Geol. Soc. of America and Univ. Kans. Press.

Ceratitidae
Ceratitida genera
Middle Triassic ammonites
Triassic ammonites of Europe